Three on the Trail is a 1936 American Western film directed by Howard Bretherton, written by Doris Schroeder and Vernon Smith, and starring William Boyd, James Ellison, Onslow Stevens, Muriel Evans, George "Gabby" Hayes, Claude King and William Duncan. It was released on April 24, 1936, by Paramount Pictures.

Premise
An evil gang is involved in both cattle rustling and the robbing of stagecoaches. Hoppy must stop them without help from the sheriff who turns out be a major outlaw himself.

Cast  
 William Boyd as Hopalong Cassidy
 James Ellison as Johnny Nelson 
 Onslow Stevens as Pecos Kane
 Muriel Evans as Mary Stevens
 George "Gabby" Hayes as Windy Halliday
 Claude King as J. P. Ridley
 William Duncan as Buck Peters
 Clara Kimball Young as Rose Peters
 John St. Polis as Sheriff Sam Corwin
 Ernie Adams as Idaho
 Al Hill as Kit Thorpe
 Ted Adams as Henchman Jim Trask
 Jack Rutherford as Henchman Lewis 
 Lita Cortez as Conchita

References

External links 
 
 
 
 

1936 films
American Western (genre) films
1936 Western (genre) films
Paramount Pictures films
Films directed by Howard Bretherton
Hopalong Cassidy films
American black-and-white films
1930s English-language films
1930s American films